Arthur Rowe (17 August 1936 – 13 September 2003) was a track and field athlete from England.

Athletics career
He represented Great Britain at the 1960 Summer Olympics in Rome, Italy and represented England and won a gold medal in the shot put at the 1958 British Empire and Commonwealth Games in Cardiff, Wales.

He won the gold medal in the men's shot put event at the 1958 European Athletics Championships in Stockholm, Sweden.

External links

 
 
 

1936 births
2003 deaths
Sportspeople from Barnsley
British male shot putters
English male shot putters
Olympic athletes of Great Britain
Athletes (track and field) at the 1960 Summer Olympics
European Athletics Championships medalists
Commonwealth Games medallists in athletics
Commonwealth Games gold medallists for England
Athletes (track and field) at the 1958 British Empire and Commonwealth Games
Medallists at the 1958 British Empire and Commonwealth Games